In Basque mythology, Basajaun ("Lord of the Woods", plural: basajaunak, female basandere) is a huge, hairy hominid dwelling in the woods. They were thought to build megaliths, protect flocks of livestock, and teach skills such as agriculture and ironworking to humans.

They were said to inhabit the forests of Gorbea and Irati. They walked in human fashion, with their bodies covered in hair and a very long mane that reached their feet.

Far from being aggressive, the Basajaunak were protective of sheep flocks and they indicated their presence with a unanimous bell shake. When a storm or wolves approached, the Basajaun would shout and whistle on the mountain to warn shepherds. In exchange, the Basajaunak receive a piece of bread as tribute, which they collected while the shepherds were asleep.

Despite this, however, the Basajaunak sometimes appear in the stories as terrifying men of the forest, of colossal forces with whom it was better not to run into, while in others the Basajaunak appear as the first farmers and holders of the secrets of architecture, agriculture, blacksmithing and sedentary life. The trickster San Martin Txiki acquired these various skills from them, which he subsequently taught to humans.

This creature also appears in Aragonese mythology, in the valleys of Tena, Anso and Broto, places that preserve Basque toponymy. There they call it Basajarau, Bonjarau or Bosnerau.

Some authors have suggested that the Basajaun myth is a folk memory of early human contact with Neanderthal populations in the Iberian Peninsula.

Legend 

 Like the Jentilak, the Basajaun is a large, hairy, wild man who lived in dark jungles and deep caves, but unlike them, he is very wise.
 The Basajaun is said to have been among the last of the surviving Jentilak during the arrival of Christianity. He is presented as the protective genius of the flocks, and when a storm approaches, he roars for the shepherds to protect the flock. He also prevents wolves from getting close to the herd. He has also been depicted as a fearsome and evil man of great strength.
 In other fables, this character is well spoken of. He is said to have been the first to know agriculture; it has also been considered a blacksmith and miller; and men are said to have learned from him the works of sowing, sawing and welding metals. Naturally, the beginnings of Christianity (Kixmi) and the spread of technology coincide with the period when the Romans came to the Basque Country.

References
Citations

Bibliography
  bnf

See also
 Wild man
 Yeti
 Bigfoot

Basque mythology
Basque legendary creatures
Forest spirits
Basque giants